Hamburg Recordings 1967 is a 2017 EP that consists of some of the last recordings by The Monks. It was released June 23, 2017 by Third Man Records on CD and single sided 12" vinyl.

Production 
The first track, "I'm Watching You", was recorded during the same sessions as the Monks' last single "Love Can Tame the Wild"/"He Went Down to the Sea".

The remaining tracks were recorded after hours at The Top Ten Club in Hamburg, after the manager, Ricky Barnes, revealed he had a recording booth set up in the club they were performing at nightly. Under pressure from Polydor, they veered away from the harder Monk's style to a softer sound more like the mainstream music of the day. The vocal track for "Yellow Grass" went missing, so is presented here as an instrumental.

The recording of "I'm Watching You" was obtained by Gary Burger with the collection of one of the Monks' managers, Walther Niemann, who had died. He played it for Ben Blackwell of Third Man Records during a visit to Nashville, after which they tried to coordinate a 7" release of it, but it did not come to pass. After Burger died, Blackwell and Eddie Shaw approached his widow inquiring if there were any other Monks recordings in the collection. She found tapes containing multiple mixes of the Top Ten Club recordings. Some mistakes were found in the recordings that were corrected in the final mixes with help from Shaw.  According to Shaw, the last track "Yellow Grass" had a vocal track, but this had apparently disappeared, so it is presented here as an instrumental.

Critical reception 

Pitchfork gave the EP a 6.9 out of 10 stating that the lighter tone of the music reflects the Monks' Hamburg contemporaries rather than the proto-punk pioneers they became revered as.

Track listing

References

External links 
 

2017 EPs
The Monks albums
Third Man Records EPs